Monteleone di Fermo is a comune (municipality) in the Province of Fermo in the Italian region Marche, located about  south of Ancona, about  north of Ascoli Piceno and  of Fermo.

Monteleone di Fermo borders the following municipalities: Belmonte Piceno, Monsampietro Morico, Montelparo, Santa Vittoria in Matenano, Servigliano.

Among the churches in the town are the following:
San Marone Martire.
San Giovanni Battista, Monteleone di Fermo.
Madonna di Loreto.
Madonna della Misericordia.

Demographic evolution

References

Cities and towns in the Marche